Jelena Tomašević (born November 1, 1983) is a Serbian pop singer of international career famed for her strong vocal performances. She has won numerous awards for her songs and represented Serbia at 2008 Eurovision Song Contest, coming sixth with the song "Oro".

Music career 
Jelena gained notability at the age of eight when she won the top award at the children's music festival "Šarenijada" in Kragujevac and three years later, she became the winner of the Yugoslav Children's Festival. After becoming a member of the Abrašević Folklore Ensemble, one of the most successful Serbian ensembles, her music career soared. She achieved tremendous results at the most prestigious festivals in Central and Eastern Europe (Czech Republic, Belarus, Bulgaria etc.). 
In 1996. at the Folklore Festival Serbian Ensemble's she won the award of the best soloist.

In 2002, Jelena emerged on the Serbian music scene and her career as a pop singer started to take off. She competed and won over the jury in an Idol style show, called "3K dur" aired on RTS3 with the aim of promoting young talented artists.

After this turning point in Jelena's career, she made a huge breakthrough. In 2003, she competed for the first time at the Budva Festival and finished second at the prestigious festival "Slavjanski bazar" in Belarus. The same year she collaborated with music group Biber.

In 2004, singing the song "Kad ne bude tvoje ljubavi" with great success at the Beovizija Festival, the Serbian selection for the Eurovision Song Contest.

In 2005, she started a professional involvement with popular Serbian singer Željko Joksimović. She became a member of Minacord Production Company. At the Beovizija 2005, she sang the song "Jutro" composed by Željko Joksimović, written by Aleksandra Milutinović and won. Jelena was considered one of the favourites, ultimately she missed out in controversial fashion at the overall Serbia and Montenegro final (Evropesma), when all four Montenegrin jurors overlooked it in distributing their points. This was the final appearance at the contest for a united Serbia and Montenegro.

Later the same year, she sang the soundtrack to the film Ivkova slava which was written by Željko Joksimović. The film pulled in a record number of viewers. In September 2005, she sang at the opening of the EuroBasket 2005 in Belgrade. At the end of this year she was a guest in Joksimović's album.

Many songs of her debut album "Panta rei" are written by her. In 2007, was her first appearance as a lyrics writer, she wrote the song "Gotova stvar", for the Montenegrin singer Milena Vučić.

In December 2007, Jelena Tomašević entered the Beovizija 2008. Open competition with song "Oro" composed by Željko Joksimović and written by Dejan Ivanović. In March 2008, she won the Serbian national selection, having received the highest number of points from both the jury and televoters. She was awarded as the best interpretation prize by the selection jury. She represented Serbia in Eurovision Song Contest 2008 in Belgrade and came sixth.

Her debut album Panta rei successfully released in October 2008. Including 15 tracks, most composed by Željko Joksimović.

In 2009, Jelena recorded a trio song dedicated to peace, with the participants of Eurovision 2008, Boaz Mauda (Israel) and Sirusho (Armenia). The song is called "Time To Pray" and the lyricist is the president of Israel, Shimon Peres. The song premiered in Serbia during the Serbian National Final of Eurovision 2009, also presented in Armenia and Israel that same year.

In memoriam music collection "Toše i prijatelji" in 2010, Jelena Tomašević taking part with song "Gde da odem da te ne volim" composed by Toše Proeski. The summer of that year she filmed her spot in Ibiza and toured Yugoslavia as guest at Joksimović's concerts.

In 2011, Jelena traveled to Canada and US for two traditional theme concerts. Unfortunately she appeared only in Toronto, because of a problem with her visa when she arrived in Chicago.

After a small pause because of her wedding and her daughter's birth, on February 24, 2012, Jelena released at the TV Show Ja imam talenat, song "Melanholija". The composer is Rafael Artesero from Spain and lyrics writer Ljiljana Jorgovanović. 
Next year on June 23, released her second single "Vertigo" from her upcoming album. Her good friend and college Emina Jahović is the composer and lyrics writer.

Same year, on October 5, 2013, Jelena traveled in Barcelona, where invited from OGAE Spain to sing for Eurovision fans. 
Also, there she filmed her video clip for the song "Radio svira za nas", which realised on November 26, 2013. The composer is Darko Dimitrov and lyrics writer Aleksandra Milutinović.

Exactly one year later, this time OGAE Portugal asked Jelena as a guest star at their ESC party. Jelena competed in two concerts at Setubal with great Portuguese artists.

On December 6, 2014, Jelena finished her records for her second studio album. On 29. May 2015 she released one more single, called "Ime moje". One month later her homonym album (cc "Ime moje") is out, expect new songs, including her last three years singles and some old songs that never released on an album. She used to say that this album is full of songs given to her as presents from good friends and colleges.

From 2014 to 2018 she appeared as a judge in the Serbian children's talent show Pinkove zvezdice.

Theatre appearance 

On 2012, Jelena took part at the musical "Beli ždralovi" held in Belgrade. It's based on the Soviet movie "The cranes are flying". In 2015, Belarusian president Alexander Lukashenko invited this musical performance to Minsk on May 5, 2015, the celebration day of victory against Nazis. The director is the Serbian actress Ivana Žigon.

Personal life 

Jelena finished Elementary School and Mathematic Gymnasium in Kragujevac in 2002. That same year she started studying English (in which she is fluent) at the University of Kragujevac. She has put her studies on hold but plans to graduate one day. 

On August 28, 2011, she married the Serbian actor Ivan Bosiljčić; and on January 24, 2012, they had a baby girl named Ninoslava.

Discography

Albums

Singles

References

External links 

 

1983 births
Living people
Musicians from Kragujevac
People from Negotin
21st-century Serbian women singers
Serbian pop singers
Eurovision Song Contest entrants for Serbia
Eurovision Song Contest entrants of 2008
Contraltos
Indexi Award winners
Beovizija contestants
Beovizija winners